Clive Andrew Rose (born 13 October 1989) is an Australian cricketer who played for Victoria and Tasmania. Rose is a left-arm orthodox spinner. He is of Pakistani heritage.

In October 2013, Rose hit 26 off 9 deliveries to give Tasmania a dramatic final-over win over Queensland in the Ryobi Cup. He also played for the Hobart Hurricanes in the Big Bash League.

Rose has also represented Victoria in Indoor cricket.

References

Living people
1989 births
Australian cricketers
Tasmania cricketers
Victoria cricketers
Melbourne Stars cricketers
Hobart Hurricanes cricketers
Australian sportspeople of Pakistani descent